This article lists the athletes who won a medal (awarded retrospectively by the International Olympic Committee) to 1896 Summer Olympics in Athens (Greece).
{| id="toc" class="toc" summary="Contents"
|-
| style="text-align:center;" colspan=3|Contents
|-
|
Athletics
Cycling
Fencing
|valign=top|
Gymnastics
Shooting
Swimming
|valign=top|
Tennis
Weightlifting
Wrestling

|}


Athletics

Cycling

Fencing

Gymnastics

Shooting

Swimming

Tennis

Weightlifting

Wrestling

See also
 1896 Summer Olympics medal table

References

External links

Medalists
Lists of Summer Olympic medalists by year